Olav's Dreams is a 2012 novel by Norwegian writer Jon Fosse.

The story is set a few hundred years ago. The fiddler "Olav" is hunted by his past as a killer. Leaving the city and changing his name has not helped much.

Awards
In 2015, Fosse was awarded the Nordic Council's Literature Prize for the trilogy Wakefulness, Olavs draumar and Weariness.

References

External links
 American publicity page

2012 novels
21st-century Norwegian novels
Norwegian-language novels
Nordic Council's Literature Prize-winning works
Novels by Jon Fosse